Edgar Bruno da Silva (born 3 January 1987), known simply as Edgar, is a Brazilian professional footballer who plays as a striker.

Club career
Born in São Carlos, São Paulo, Edgar started professionally for São Paulo FC in 2006, being loaned by Série C side Joinville Esporte Clube. In January 2007 he moved to Portugal with S.C. Beira-Mar, scoring four league goals which proved insufficient in avoiding relegation from the Primeira Liga; also in that year, he was part of the Brazilian under-20 team that won the South American Youth Football Championship.

In the 2007 summer transfer window, Edgar was transferred to FC Porto but, after featuring sparingly, moved on loan to fellow league club Associação Académica de Coimbra. He joined Red Star Belgrade in Serbia in July 2008 on a season-long loan, but, in January of the following year, he was released by Porto and returned to Brazil, signing for CR Vasco da Gama.

In August 2009, Edgar returned to Portugal after agreeing to join C.D. Nacional, which had just lost Nenê – 2008–09's league top scorer – to Cagliari Calcio. He started off well, netting seven times in as many games, including twice in a 2–1 derby win against C.S. Marítimo and a hat-trick at Leixões SC (4–2).

Edgar enjoyed another productive season in 2010–11, scoring ten goals in the league with Vitória de Guimarães to help the Minho team qualify to the UEFA Europa League. He also netted five in seven appearances in the campaign's Portuguese Cup, including one in the final against Porto, albeit in a 2–6 loss – he also missed a penalty kick with the score levelled at 2–2.

In July 2012, Edgar moved to UAE Pro-League side Al Shabab (Dubai) on a one-year contract. On 16 August 2016, he left Al-Wasl F.C. also in the UAE Arabian Gulf League and signed a two-year deal with Turkish club Adanaspor, being released the following January.

In 2022, during the 2022 AFC Champions League qualifying play-offs against Buriram United, Edgar got an achilles tendon injury and had to miss rest of the season. Eventually, he had to leave the club through a mutual consent.

Honours

Club
São Paulo
Campeonato Brasileiro Série A: 2006

Porto
Primeira Liga: 2007–08

Vasco
Campeonato Brasileiro Série B: 2009

Al Shabab
GCC Champions League: 2015

Lekhwiya
Qatar Stars League: 2016–17

Daegu
Korean FA Cup: 2018

International
Brazil U-20
South American Youth Football Championship: 2007

References

External links

1987 births
Living people
People from São Carlos
Footballers from São Paulo (state)
Brazilian footballers
Association football forwards
Campeonato Brasileiro Série A players
Joinville Esporte Clube players
São Paulo FC players
CR Vasco da Gama players
Primeira Liga players
S.C. Beira-Mar players
FC Porto players
C.D. Nacional players
Associação Académica de Coimbra – O.A.F. players
Vitória S.C. players
Serbian SuperLiga players
Red Star Belgrade footballers
UAE Pro League players
Al Shabab Al Arabi Club Dubai players
Al-Wasl F.C. players
Süper Lig players
Adanaspor footballers
Qatar Stars League players
Lekhwiya SC players
Thai League 1 players
Buriram United F.C. players
K League 1 players
Daegu FC players
Brazil youth international footballers
Brazilian expatriate footballers
Expatriate footballers in Portugal
Expatriate footballers in Serbia
Expatriate footballers in the United Arab Emirates
Expatriate footballers in Turkey
Expatriate footballers in Qatar
Expatriate footballers in Thailand
Expatriate footballers in South Korea
Brazilian expatriate sportspeople in Portugal
Brazilian expatriate sportspeople in Serbia
Brazilian expatriate sportspeople in the United Arab Emirates
Brazilian expatriate sportspeople in Turkey
Brazilian expatriate sportspeople in Qatar
Brazilian expatriate sportspeople in Thailand
Brazilian expatriate sportspeople in South Korea